Jürgen Köhler (born 22 February 1946, in Leipzig) is a former East German slalom canoeist who competed in the 1960s and 1970s. He won three medals at the ICF Canoe Slalom World Championships with a gold (C-1 team: 1971), a silver (C-1 team: 1967) and a bronze (C-2 team: 1973).

Köhler also finished sixth in the C-1 event at the 1972 Summer Olympics in Munich.

References
 

1946 births
Canoeists at the 1972 Summer Olympics
German male canoeists
Living people
Olympic canoeists of East Germany
Sportspeople from Leipzig
Medalists at the ICF Canoe Slalom World Championships